Alianta is a genus of beetle belonging to the family Staphylinidae.

The genus was first described by Thomson in 1858.

The species of this genus are found in Europe.

Species:
 Alianta incana (Erichson, 1837)

References

Staphylinidae
Staphylinidae genera